The Thyamis, also known as Glykys (Γλυκύς) or Kalamas (Καλαμάς), is a river in the Epirus region of Greece. It flows into the Ionian Sea. The names of the Chameria region (Tsamouria in Greek), as well as the Chams, derive from the river's name. 

Thyamis in ancient Greece was mentioned by Pausanias as forming the boundary between Thesprotis and Kestrine. In addition, Suda and Ptolemaeus mentioned it.

Some Renaissance scholars believed that the English River Thames owed its name to the River Thyamis, as early Celtic tribes were thought to have migrated from the Epirus region to England. While this belief influenced the modern spelling of the English river's name, it is no longer regarded as credible.

Geography

The source of the river is near the village Kalpaki, in the northwestern part of the Ioannina regional unit. It flows south at first, and turns southwest near Soulopoulo. It receives its tributary Tyria near Vrosina, and turns west near Kyparisso in Thesprotia, where the hydroelectric dam is located. It empties into the Ionian Sea near the village Kestrini, between Igoumenitsa and Sagiada, close to the Albanian border.

Places along the river include, from source to mouth: Mazaraki, Soulopoulo, Vrosina, Raveni, Pente Ekklisies, Kyparisso, Parapotamos and Kestrini.

During the interwar period of the 20th century, Albanian speaking villages of the Thyamis delta and river basin were small and scattered compared to the upland larger Greek villages of the hilly area to the north.

Environment
Thyamis forms a river delta where it empties in the Ionian Sea, north of Igoumenitsa. The delta is known for being rich in flora and migrating birds stop in its waters for food and rest.

The river, however, has suffered from environmental degradation for decades, due to uncontrolled human activities (farming activity, urban and industrial effluents and waste, lack of management plan and poor coordination of competent authorities for its protection).

See also
 Battle of Elaia–Kalamas
 List of rivers of Europe
 List of rivers of Greece

References

External links
Greek Travel Pages - River Thyamis

Landforms of Thesprotia
Rivers of Greece
Landforms of Ioannina (regional unit)
Rivers of Epirus (region)